Tucktonia was a late 1970s theme park located on Stour Road, Christchurch, Dorset, England. It was officially opened on 23 May 1976 by Arthur Askey. It originally occupied  of the  Tuckton Park Leisure Complex. The park was closed down in 1986. The site has since been redeveloped for residential use.

General information
The park was best known for its large model village layout, which included a representation of London.

The  narrow gauge ride-on steam train and some additional fixtures and fittings, were moved to the Moors Valley Railway in the Moors Valley Country Park near Ringwood, Hampshire.

It is rumoured that just prior to the closure of the park, the owners wanted to build a roller coaster at the rear of the site, but were refused permission by the local council. Following the refusal, the park closed shortly afterwards.

Bekonscot Model Village in Buckinghamshire provided much inspiration for the designers, one of whom had his office near Bekonscot and was a frequent visitor. The bulk of the models were built by KLF Ltd, who later went on to design similar models at Britannia Park in Derbyshire (known as "The American Adventure" theme park by the time of its demise in 2006). Tucktonia was the brainchild of former double British Formula 3 champion Harry Stiller who was still living in the area in 2006, before his death in 2018.

Some sources claim that the miniature London landmarks were destroyed during the making of the 1985 alien invasion movie Lifeforce, and that the entire model village was destroyed when the park closed.  However, other sources claim that, while the model village was used as the miniature set for the filming of Lifeforce, the visual effects crew actually used their own destructible miniatures in the Tucktonia streets. The model of Buckingham Palace survives; this was acquired, restored and put on display at the Wimborne Model Town, Wimborne Minster in 2002, and moved to Merrivale Model Village, Great Yarmouth in 2006.
 
There are numerous unsubstantiated rumours that the models were not destroyed after the closure of the park – the main one being that they were instead placed into storage within a barn where they remained until 2001, when the building burnt down.

BBC Television's Multi-Coloured Swap Shop show broadcast live from the park on one occasion.

The park's model London was used extensively in the obscure 1976 King Kong spoof Queen Kong.

Places and buildings featured in the model village
 Christchurch Priory
 Prospect of Whitby (London pub)
 High Street, Great Britain – a re-creation of a "typical" British High Street
 London's Tower Bridge, The Victoria Embankment, The Houses of Parliament, Westminster Bridge, Cleopatra's Needle, HMS "Discovery", The National Westminster Tower, Piccadilly Circus

Rides and attractions present whilst the park was operating

After closure
After the park closed in 1986, the buildings and fixtures were cleared and the land used at first for a public house called "The Olde Colonial", then, at a later date, "Bar Max". These were housed in the original buildings built by Harry Stiller and operated by him and known as the Golfer's Arms. This was a highly popular venue for both locals and tourists alike and featured the Raceway bar, where one of Harry Stiller's original race cars was a centrepiece on one of the walls in the main bar.

At a later date in the 1990s these buildings were cleared, and a number of retirement flats were built. These currently occupy the former site.

References

External links
Moors Valley Railway
Original Tucktonia Brochures and other memorabilia
BBC Radio Solent's Jon Cuthill goes in search of Tucktonia

History of Christchurch, Dorset
Defunct amusement parks in the United Kingdom
Defunct amusement parks in England
Amusement parks in England
Buildings and structures in Christchurch, Dorset
Miniature parks
Tourist attractions in Christchurch, Dorset
1976 establishments in England
1986 disestablishments in England
Amusement parks opened in 1976
Amusement parks closed in 1986